Marco Antonio Rigau Gaztambide (March 5, 1919 in Ponce, Puerto Rico – August 29, 1985) was as an associate justice of the Puerto Rico Supreme Court from 1961 until his resignation in 1981.  He was a member of Fi Sigma Alfa fraternity.

References

1919 births
1985 deaths
Associate Justices of the Supreme Court of Puerto Rico
Civil servants from Ponce
Puerto Rican lawyers